Toyota Motor Korea Co., Ltd. is the South Korean subsidiary of Japan-based conglomerate Toyota, which specializes in the sales and distribution of Toyota and Lexus automobiles in South Korea.

History
After establishing a local subsidiary in March 2000, Toyota first launched the Lexus brand in 2001. Through the mid-2000s, Lexus experienced sales successes in South Korea, becoming the top-selling import make in that markets in 2005. Nonetheless, Toyota Motor Korea still could not import the Toyota brand due to tariffs and South Korean policy issues. However, in order to meet the diversifying needs of users in South Korea, where the market for imported cars from Japan such as Nissan, Mitsubishi, and Honda is growing rapidly, Toyota Motor Korea decided to introduce the Toyota brand in addition to Lexus, and opened each showroom on October 20, 2009. As of February 2022, it has 25 sales offices, including 6 in Seoul.

Models
There are 9 Toyota vehicles currently sold in South Korea.
Toyota Sienna
Toyota Avalon (Only HEV is available)
Toyota Camry (Only HEV and Gasoline is available)
Toyota Prius
Toyota Prius Plug-in Hybrid (formerly known as Prius Prime)
Toyota RAV4 (Only HEV is available)
Toyota GR Supra
Toyota GR86

References

External links

Toyota subsidiaries
Automotive companies of South Korea
Companies based in Seoul
Vehicle manufacturing companies established in 2000
South Korean companies established in 2000
South Korean subsidiaries of foreign companies